Yaguine Koïta (born September 25, 1984) and Fodé Tounkara (born April 6, 1985) were wheel-well stowaways who froze to death on a Sabena Airlines Airbus A330 (Flight 520) flying from Conakry, Guinea, to Brussels, Belgium, on July 28, 1999.  Their bodies were discovered on August 2 in the airplane's rear right-hand wheel bay at Brussels International Airport, after having made at least three return trips between Conakry and Brussels.  The boys were carrying plastic bags with birth certificates, school report cards, family photographs and a letter.  This letter, written in imperfect French, was widely published in the world media. Several associations commemorate Yaguine and Fodé annually on August 2 at Brussels Airport.

Their story was made into a film -  in 2006.
Singer and songwriter John Legend dedicated his 2007 song Show Me to the boys and their story.

English translation of the letter
Excellencies, Messrs. members and officials of Europe,

We have the honorable pleasure and the great confidence in you to write this letter to speak to you about the objective of our journey and the suffering of us, the children and young people of Africa.

But first of all, we present to you life's most delicious, charming and respected greetings.  To this effect, be our support and our assistance.  You are for us, in Africa, those to whom it is necessary to request relief.  We implore you, for the love of your continent, for the feeling that you have towards your people and especially for the affinity and love that you have for your children whom you love for a lifetime.  Furthermore, for the love and meekness of our creator God the omnipotent one who gave you all the good experiences, wealth and ability to well construct and well organize your continent to become the most beautiful one and most admirable among the others.

Messrs. members and officials of Europe, we call out for your solidarity and your kindness for the relief of Africa.  Do help us, we suffer enormously in Africa, we have problems and some shortcomings regarding the rights of the child.

In terms of problems, we have war, disease, malnutrition, etc.  As for the rights of the child in Africa, and especially in Guinea, we have too many schools but a great lack of education and training.  Only in the private schools can one have a good education and good training, but it takes a great sum of money.  Now, our parents are poor and it is necessary for them to feed us.  Furthermore, we have no sports schools where we could practice soccer, basketball or tennis.

This is the reason, we, African children and youth, ask you to create a big efficient organization for Africa to allow us to progress.

Therefore, if you see that we have sacrificed ourselves and risked our lives, this is because we suffer too much in Africa and that we need you to fight against poverty and to put an end to the war in Africa.  Nevertheless, we want to learn, and we ask you to help us in Africa learn to be like you.

Finally, we appeal to you to excuse us very, very much for daring to write this letter to you, the great personages to whom we owe much respect.  And do not forget it is to you whom we must lament about the weakness of our abilities in Africa.

Written by two Guinean children, Yaguine Koita and Fodé Tounkara.

Original French text
Excellences, Messieurs les membres et responsables d'Europe,

Nous avons l'honorable plaisir et la grande confiance de vous écrire cette lettre pour vous parler de l'objectif de notre voyage et de la souffrance de nous, les enfants et jeunes d'Afrique.

Mais tout d'abord, nous vous présentons les salutations les plus délicieuses, adorables et respectées dans la vie. A cet effet, soyez notre appui et notre aide. Vous êtes pour nous, en Afrique, ceux à qui il faut demander au secours. Nous vous en supplions, pour l'amour de votre continent, pour le sentiment que vous avez envers votre peuple et surtout pour l'affinité et l'amour que vous avez pour vos enfants que vous aimez pour la vie. En plus, pour l'amour et la timidité de notre créateur Dieu le tout-puissant qui vous a donné toutes les bonnes expériences, richesses et pouvoirs de bien construire et bien organiser votre continent à devenir le plus beau et admirable parmi les autres.

Messieurs les membres et responsables d'Europe, c'est de votre solidarité et votre gentillesse que nous vous crions au secours en Afrique. Aidez-nous, nous souffrons énormément en Afrique, nous avons des problèmes et quelques manques au niveau des droits de l'enfant.

Au niveau des problèmes, nous avons la guerre, la maladie, le manque de nourriture, etc. Quant aux droits de l'enfant, c'est en Afrique, et surtout en Guinée nous avons trop d'écoles mais un grand manque d'éducation et d'enseignement. Sauf dans les écoles privées où l'on peut avoir une bonne éducation et un bon enseignement, mais il faut une forte somme d'argent. Or, nos parents sont pauvres et il leur faut nous nourrir. Ensuite, nous n'avons pas non plus d'écoles sportives où nous pourrions pratiquer le football, le basket ou le tennis.

C'est pourquoi, nous, les enfants et jeunes Africains, vous demandons de faire une grande organisation efficace pour l'Afrique pour nous permettre de progresser.

Donc, si vous voyez que nous nous sacrifions et exposons notre vie, c'est parce qu'on souffre trop en Afrique et qu'on a besoin de vous pour lutter contre la pauvreté et pour mettre fin à la guerre en Afrique. Néanmoins, nous voulons étudier, et nous vous demandons de nous aider à étudier pour être comme vous en Afrique.

Enfin, nous vous supplions de nous excuser très très fort d'oser vous écrire cette lettre en tant que Vous, les grands personages à qui nous devons beaucoup de respect. Et n'oubliez pas que c'est à vous que nous devons nous plaindre de la faiblesse de notre force en Afrique.

Ecrit par deux enfants guinéens, Yaguine Koita et Fodé Tounkara.

References

Stowaways
1984 births
1985 births
1999 deaths
Guinean children
Deaths from hypothermia